Everybody's Got a Story is Amanda Marshall's third studio album. The album was certified platinum by the CRIA selling over 100,000 copies across Canada. It is currently her latest album of original material.

Track listing
"Everybody's Got a Story" (Amanda Marshall, Billy Mann, Marvin Leonard (Molecules)) - 4:11
"The Voice Inside" (Marshall, Mann, Peter Asher, Molecules) - 3:01
"The Gypsy" (Marshall, Mann, Molecules) - 4:30
"Colleen (I Saw Him First)" (Marshall, Mann, Molecules) - 5:10
"Double Agent" (Marshall, Mann, Asher, Molecules) - 4:41
"Red Magic Marker" (Marshall, Mann, Asher, Molecules) - 3:26
"Sunday Morning After" (Marshall, Mann, Asher, Molecules) - 4:44
"Love Is My Witness" (Marshall, Mann) - 3:21
"Dizzy" (Marshall, Mann, Molecules) - 4:02
"Brand New Beau" (Marshall, Mann, Asher, Molecules) - 4:24
"Marry Me" (Marshall, Rob Misener) - 3:51
"Inside the Tornado" (Marshall, Mann) - 1:43

Personnel
Amanda Marshall - Vocals, Background Vocals
Billy Mann - Acoustic & Electric Guitars, Keyboards, Background Vocal Arrangements, Background Vocals
Molecules - Drum and Percussion Programming
Peter Asher - Baritone Electric Guitar, Background Vocals
Steven Wolf - Live Drums and Additional Programming
Jack Daley - Bass
Paul Pimsler - Electric Guitars
Sandy Park - Concertmaster, Contractor, Solo Violin
David Campbell - Orchestral Arrangements and Conducting
Jon Clarke - Woodwinds
Tim Hagans - Additional Keyboards

Year-end charts

References 

2001 albums
Amanda Marshall albums
Albums arranged by David Campbell (composer)
Albums produced by Peter Asher
Sony Music Canada albums